Guillaume Jérôme Patrick Saurina (born 4 August 1981) is a French handball player who plays for HBC Nantes.

He is the all-time topscorer in the French Division, with a total of 1224 goals scored.

Achievements
Championnat de France: 
Silver Medalist: 2011
Coupe de France:
Finalist: 2011
Coupe de la Ligue:
Finalist: 2011
Trophée des champions:
Finalist: 2010
Liga Națională:
Silver Medalist: 2017
Supercupa Romaniei:
Finalist: 2016

Individual awards
 Championnat de France Top Scorer: 2010, 2012

Personal life
He is married to French international handballer Camille Ayglon.

References

French male handball players
Sportspeople from Nîmes
Living people
1981 births
Expatriate handball players
French expatriate sportspeople in Romania
Competitors at the 2009 Mediterranean Games
Mediterranean Games silver medalists for France
Mediterranean Games medalists in handball